The Abbey of Saint-Evroul or Saint-Evroul-sur-Ouche (Saint-Evroult-sur-Ouche, Saint-Evroul-en-Ouche, Saint-Evroult-en-Ouche, Abbaye de Saint-Evroult, Sanctus Ebrulphus Uticensis ) is a former Benedictine abbey in Normandy, located in the present commune of Saint-Evroult-Notre-Dame-du-Bois, Orne, Normandy. It has been classified as a historical monument since 1967. Its name refers to its founder, Ebrulf (Evroul), who founded a hermitage in the forest of Ouche around 560. The abbey was rebuilt around 1000.

Robert de Grantmesnil served as abbot of Saint-Evroul, which he helped restore in 1050.  He had become a monk at Saint-Evroul before becoming its abbot.

 

Orderic Vitalis entered the abbey as a young boy and later wrote a history of the abbey.

Musical tradition 

Normandy was the site of several important developments in the history of classical music in the 11th century. Fécamp Abbey and Saint-Evroul were centres of musical production and education. At Saint-Evroul, a tradition of singing had developed and the choir achieved fame in Normandy. After entering into a violent quarrel with William II of Normandy, Robert de Grantmesnil had been forced to flee to Rome in January 1061 and thence to the court of Robert Guiscard in Salerno, taking with him eleven of his monks, including his nephew Berengar.  In his time, Saint-Evroul was famed for its musical programme and these eleven monks brought its musical traditions to the abbey of Sant'Eufemia (now part of the town of Lamezia Terme and different from Sant'Eufemia d'Aspromonte) in Calabria, a foundation of the Guiscards, of which Robert became abbot.

Burials 
Hugh de Grandmesnil and his wife Adelize

Illustrious Members 

 Lanfranc, prior of Bec and then of Saint-Évroult, before becoming abbot of Saint-Étienne de Caen and archbishop of Canterbury.
 Robert de Grandmesnil
 Orderic Vital is, monk of Saint-Évroult, editor of the Historia ecclesiastica.
 Serlon and Philippe the Baker, who became bishops of Sées.
 Frilion or Foulques, who became abbot of Saint-Pierre-sur-Dives.
 Robert du Chalet, first abbot of Lyre.

List of Abbots 
This incomplete list is compiled from the Gallia Christiana and the Normannia monastica

 Saint Evroult
 Raginger, who attended the Council of Attigny called by Pepin the Short in 765.

The abbey eventually fell to ruin, and was refounded first by monks from the abbey of Bec, before being occupied under the patronage of the de Grandmesnil family.

 Theodoric (b. Thierry de Mathonville), 1050–1057
 Robert de Grandmesnil 1059–1061; d. 1079 as abbot of Sainte-Euphémie, in Calabria after fleeing the wrath of William the Conqueror.
 Osbern of Cormeilles 1061–1066; installed against the wishes of the monks of Saint-Evroul, on the advice of Hugh, bishop of Lisieux.
 Mainier d'Échauffour 1066–1089; was abbot when Orderic Vitalis first arrived at the monastery, and was noted as an attendee at the funeral of William the Conqueror. Responsible for rebuilding much of the abbey and its grounds.
 Serlon of Orgères 1089–1091; his abbacy was spent in conflict with Gilbert Maminot, Hugh's successor as bishop of Lisieux. Would leave the monastery to become bishop of Sées in 1091.
 Roger of Le Sap 1091–1122; oversaw the consecration of the abbey church begun by Mainer.
 Warin des Essarts 1123–1137
 Richard of Leicester 1137–1140; attended the Second Lateran Council in 1139.
 Renoulf 1140–1159; had been prior of Noyon.
 Bernard 1159—1159; deposed for poor management of the abbey's finances.
 Robert II of Blangy 1159–1177; originally from Bec.
 Raoul of Sainte-Colombe 1177/8—1189
 Richard II 1189–1190
 Renaud 1190–1214; responsible for the translation of the remains of Saint Evroult, Saint Agilus, and Saint Ausbert of Rebais to the abbey.
 Herbert 1217
 Geoffroi 1218
 Robert de Salmonville 1233
 Nicholas 1247; who left to join the Carthusian order.
 Richard of Val-Corjon 1269
 Nicolas de Villiers 1274; abdicated his post.
 William of Montpinçon 1281
 Geoffroi of Girouart 1281–1303
 Thomas of Douet-Artus 1309
 Nicolas of Pont-Chardon 1316
 Raoul Grant 1318; former prior of Ware in England.
 Richard de Tiercelin 1334
 Nicolas Hébert 1352
 Elie Jean du Bois 1366
 Philip the Breton 1392
 Guillaume de Vergy 1392–1395; a commendatory abbot as archbishop of Besançon and a cardinal.
 Robert le Tellier 1395–1408; former prior of Saint-Hymer, regular abbot.
 Michel of Philippe 1439; former prior of Saint-Martin de Noyon
 Robert the Apostle 1459
 William de Seilleys 1466
 Jacques of Espinasse 1484; last regular abbot of Saint-Evroult

The Commendatory Abbots 

 Auger of Brie 1484–1503; canon of Chartres, Protonotary apostolic, and archdeacon of Rouen.
 George of Amboise 1503; cardinal and archbishop of Rouen, appointed by Pope Pius III.
 Felix of Brie 1503–1546; nephew of Auger of Brie, dean of Le Mans. He found himself in competition with Guillaume of Hellenvilliers, who had been elected by the monks of the abbey.
 Gabriel Le Veneur 1574; Bishop of Evreux.
 Antoine Evrard of Saint-Sulpice; Bishop of Cahors.
 Luigi d'Este 1586; cardinal.
 Antoine de Roquelaure 1588–1595
 François de Sacquépée 1613; of the Premonstratensian Selincourt Abbey.
 Charles, Chaliveau de la Bretonnière 1625; councillor and chaplain of the king.
 Nicolas Aligre ~1638
 Antonio Barberini d. 1671; Italian cardinal, archbishop of Reims, Grand Chaplain of France.
 Guillaume Egon 1671–1689; cardinal, resigned. Died in 1704 as abbot of Saint-Germain-des-Prés.
 François Gobert 1702; Count of Apremont and Reckein, Canon of Strasbourg and Cologne.
 Charles-Philippe Gobert 1703–1719; brother of François Gobert.
 Charles of Saint Aubin 1721–1764; Bishop of Laon, Archbishop of Cambrai.
 Henri-Louis-René des Nos 1764–1769; Bishop of Rennes, Bishop of Verdun.
 François Bareau de Girac 1769–1791, Bishop of Saint-Brieuc, Bishop of Rennes, died in 1820 canon of Saint-Denis.

Notes

Secondary sources 
Joranson, Einar. "The Inception of the Career of the Normans in Italy — Legend and History." Speculum, Vol. 23, No. 3. (July, 1948), pp 353–396.

External links 
Abbayes Normandes

Benedictine monasteries in France
Christian monasteries established in the 11th century
Buildings and structures in Orne
Ruins in Normandy
Tourist attractions in Orne